Lilting is a 2014 British romantic drama film written and directed by Cambodian-born British director Hong Khaou and produced by Dominic Buchanan.

The film had its world premiere on 16 January 2014 on Day One of the Sundance Film Festival, at which it competed in the World Cinema Dramatic Competition. It won the "Cinematography Award: World Cinema Dramatic" at the festival. The film was released theatrically in United Kingdom on 8 August 2014 and in the United States on 26 September 2014.

Synopsis 
Lilting tells the story of a mother's attempt at understanding who her son was after his untimely death. Her world is suddenly disrupted by the presence of his lover. Together, they attempt to overcome their grief whilst struggling against not having a shared language.

Cast 
 Ben Whishaw as Richard
 Cheng Pei-pei as Junn
 Naomi Christie as Vann
 Peter Bowles as Alan
 Morven Christie as Margaret
 Andrew Leung as Kai

Production 
The script, originally titled Lilting the Past, won third spot in the 2011 Brit List, a list of the best unproduced British screenplays.

The film was one of three films greenlit by Microwave in early 2012. A casting call was later released for the three lead roles, later filled by Cheng Pei-pei, Ben Whishaw, and Andrew Leung.

Filming began in November 2012  and completed principal photography in December 2012. Director Khaou has said the film will be visually inspired by Wong Kar-wai's In the Mood for Love.

During production, as part of the Microwave scheme, Michael Winterbottom mentored writer/director Khaou, while producer Buchanan was mentored by Ken Marshall, producer of London to Brighton, Filth and Song for Marion. As with all Microwave films, the budget was £120,000. It is the first bilingual film to be made under the Microwave scheme.

Reception

Critical response 
Lilting was met with positive reviews from critics. , the film holds an 84% approval rating on review aggregator Rotten Tomatoes, based on 55 reviews with an average rating of 6.88/10. The website's critics consensus reads: "Skillfully weaving multiple delicate tonal strands into a quietly affecting whole, Lilting serves as a thoroughly compelling calling card for writer-director Hong Khaou." On Metacritic the film has 61 rating from 22 reviews indicating "Generally favorable reviews."

Justin Chang, in his review for Variety, said that the film "Hong Khaou makes a fine debut with this quietly resonant cross-cultural chamber piece." David Rooney of The Hollywood Reporter praised the film, saying, "Delicate and unhurried almost to a fault, though also hauntingly sexy and even humorous at times." Amber Wilkinson from Telegraph gave the film three out of five stars and praised the lead actor that "Whishaw is magnetic as a man pushed to the edge of fragility by mourning, but who still suggests a quiet strength." Dominic Mill of We Got This Covered gave a positive review and said, "The subject matter is powerful, and the performances are wonderful – in a world of big and showy dramatism, Lilting gets its point across without feeling the need to shout about it."

Accolades

References

External links 
 
 
 
 
 

2014 films
2014 LGBT-related films
2014 romantic drama films
BBC Film films
British LGBT-related films
British romantic drama films
Films set in London
Films shot in London
Gay-related films
LGBT-related romantic drama films
Sundance Film Festival award winners
2014 directorial debut films
2010s English-language films
2010s British films